Chae Seo-jin (born 30 April 1994) is a South Korean actress. She started her career as a young actress in Over the Rainbow (2006). She is known to be Kim Ok-vin's sister. In May 2016, Chae decided to use Chae Seo-jin as her stage name instead of her birth name, Kim Go-un.

Career 
Chae started her acting career in 2006 where she played young Jung Hee-soo in Over the Rainbow.

In 2011, Chae made her musical debut in Catch a Timid Man.

In 2014, Chae made her big screen debut in the movie My Brilliant Life.

In 2015, Chae was cast as the female lead role in the movie Overman, which was played at the 20th Busan International Film Festival.

Chae was cast in several films in 2016; namely Write or Dance, Curtain Call, and Will You Be There?. The same year, Chae starred in the web drama Be Positive alongside EXO's Do Kyung-soo.

In 2017, Chae was cast in the teen drama Lingerie Girls’ Generation.

In 2018, Chae starred in the romantic comedy drama Coffee, Do Me a Favor.

In 2019, Chae made a short appearance in the romantic fantasy drama Melting Me Softly along with Ji Chang Wook. The same year, Chae starred in the romantic drama Yeonnam Family as the main lead alongside Na In Woo.

Filmography

Film

Television series

Music video appearances

Musical

References

External links 
 
 
 

1994 births
Living people
21st-century South Korean actresses
South Korean film actresses
South Korean television actresses
South Korean web series actresses